The Department of Home Affairs ensures the safety, protection and security of the Isle of Man.

The Department is responsible for the Isle of Man Constabulary, the Isle of Man Fire and Rescue Service, the Prison and Probation Service, emergency planning and Civil Defence.

The current Minister for Justice and Home Affairs is Jane Poole-Wilson MHK.

Function

Isle of Man Constabulary
Isle of Man Fire and Rescue Service
Prison and Probation Service
Emergency Planning and Civil Defence
Emergency Services Joint Control Room

Agencies reporting to the Department of Home Affairs
Communications Commission

Current and previous Ministers and Chairs

Minister for Home Affairs (Minister for Justice and Home Affairs with effect from 1 December 2020)
Hon. Jane Poole-Wilson MHK, from October 2021
Hon. Graham Cregeen MHK, 3 March 2020 – October 2021
Hon. David Ashford MHK, 21 February 2020 – 2 March 2020
Hon. Bill Malarkey MHK, 7 October 2016 – 20 February 2020
Hon. John Shimmin MHK, 28 September 2016 – 6 October 2016
Hon. Juan Watterson MHK, 13 September 2012 – 27 September 2016
Hon. John Shimmin MHK, 3 September 2012 - 12 September 2012
Hon. Juan Watterson MHK, 14 October 2011 - 2 September 2012
Hon. Adrian Earnshaw MHK, 11 August 2008 - 13 October 2011
Hon. Martyn Quayle MHK, 15 December 2006 - 10 August 2008
Hon. John Shimmin MHK, 1 August 2005 - 14 December 2006
Hon. Phil Braidwood MHK, 6 December 2001 - 31 July 2005
Hon. Allan Bell MHK, 6 December 1996 - 5 December 2001
Hon. Richard Corkill MHK, 13 March 1995 - 5 December 1996
Hon. Arnold Callin MLC, 18 December 1991 - 12 March 1995
Hon. Edmund Lowey MLC, 16 December 1986 - 17 December 1991

Chair of the Home Affairs Board
Noel Cringle, 1982-1986
Ian Anderson, 1981-1982

References

Government of the Isle of Man
Law enforcement in the Isle of Man
Man, Isle of